The 1997–98 Tetley's Bitter Cup was the 27th edition of England's top rugby union club competition. Saracens won the competition, for the first time by defeating Wasps, who lost in the final for the third time. The first two rounds were unsponsored and by the third round Tetley's Brewery took over the sponsorship; the previous nine years had been sponsored by Pilkington. The final was held at Twickenham Stadium.

Draw and results

First round (13 September)

 Cheltenham's 138 – 0 win over Okehampton was a record score for the competition.

Second round (4 October)

Third round (1 November)

Fourth round (3 & 4 January)

Fifth round (24 January)

Quarter-finals (28 February & 1 March)

Semi-finals (28 March)

Final

See also
 Anglo-Welsh Cup

References

1996-97 
1997–98 rugby union tournaments for clubs
1997–98 in English rugby union